Robbins Nunatak is a conspicuous nunatak 8 nautical miles (15 km) northeast of Mount Gorecki in the Schmidt Hills portion of the Neptune Range, Pensacola Mountains. It was mapped by the United States Geological Survey (USGS) from surveys and U.S. Navy air photos, 1956–66, and was named by the Advisory Committee on Antarctic Names (US-ACAN) for Edward J. Robbins, an aerographer at Ellsworth Station, winter 1958.

Nunataks of Queen Elizabeth Land